The Oregon Citizens Alliance (OCA) was a conservative Christian political activist organization, founded by Lon Mabon in the U.S. state of Oregon. It was founded in 1986 as a vehicle to challenge then–U.S. Senator Bob Packwood in the Republican primaries, and was involved in Oregon politics from the late 1980s into the 1990s.

Legislative activism
In 1988 the group sponsored Measure 8, an initiative that repealed Governor Neil Goldschmidt's executive order banning discrimination based on sexual orientation in the executive branch of state government. The measure not only repealed the executive order, but also put a statute on the books that prohibited any job protection for gay people in state government. The measure was approved by the voters, 52.7 percent to 47.3 percent.  It was the OCA's only statewide victory.

Afterwards, the OCA turned its attention to abortion. It placed Measure 10 on the 1990 general election ballot, which would have required parental notification for a minor's abortion. The measure was defeated, 52.2 percent to 47.8 percent.

In 1992 the OCA returned to the issue of homosexuality, when it proposed Measure 9. This initiative would have amended the Oregon Constitution to prevent what the OCA called "special rights" for homosexuals and bisexuals, by adding a provision that the state "recognizes homosexuality, pedophilia, sadism and masochism as abnormal, wrong, unnatural, and perverse." The ballot measure was defeated, 56 percent to 44 percent. That same year, the Oregon Court of Appeals declared Measure 8 unconstitutional. As a result, the OCA's only statewide victory was nullified.

The OCA promoted similar measures at the local level, both before and after the 1992 election, but those measures were ultimately invalidated by the Oregon Legislative Assembly. It also promoted similar statewide measures with language softer than that of Measure 9. These included Measures 13 and 19 in 1994, and Measure 9 (sometimes referred to as "Son of 9") in 2000.

The organized opposition to 1992's Measure 9 formed the basis of much of the current LGBT rights movement in Oregon, including the organization Basic Rights Oregon.

Local efforts 
After failing to pass Measure 9 in 1992, the OCA turned its attention to passing anti-discrimination bans at the county and municipal level. Couching the debate in terms of forbidding LGBT people from receiving so-called "special rights," the OCA sought not only to block ordinances in these communities but to bar them from spending money to "promote homosexuality." The OCA was successful in passing over two dozen initiatives. However, in 1993 the Oregon Legislative Assembly passed a law prohibiting local governments from considering LGBT rights measures so the ordinances had no legal force. The Oregon Court of Appeals upheld the state law in 1995, and the Oregon Supreme Court denied review. Two weeks after the United States Supreme Court ruled in Romer v. Evans, the OCA suspended its efforts for a third statewide ballot initiative.

Hands Off Washington
In 1993, the OCA intervened in Washington state politics by introducing two ballot measures that would have threatened the employability of persons who were, or were perceived to be, LGBT. An ad hoc grassroots movement called Hands Off Washington was organized in opposition to the measures. The Hands Off Washington campaign repelled both efforts.

1996 Senate race 
In the 1996 U.S. Senate special election to succeed Senator Packwood, the OCA endorsed Gordon Smith over Ron Wyden in the race. Critics faulted Smith for failing to take a strong stand against the OCA, and he was defeated by Wyden. When Smith made a second run for the Senate a few months later after incumbent Mark Hatfield had retired, Mabon ran against Smith. The Oregonian cited Mabon's candidacy as a key component of Smith's attempt in the second race to establish himself as a centrist, contributing to his victory over Democrat Tom Bruggere.

See also 
 List of Oregon ballot measures
 List of US ballot initiatives to repeal LGBT anti-discrimination laws
 Scott Lively

References

Non-profit organizations based in Oregon
Political organizations based in the United States
Politics of Oregon
LGBT in Oregon
1986 establishments in Oregon
Conservative organizations in the United States
Organizations that oppose LGBT rights in the United States